This is a list of diplomatic missions of Guinea, excluding honorary consulates. Guinea's relations with other countries, including with West African neighbors, have improved steadily since 1985. Guinea reestablished relations with France and Germany in 1975, and with neighboring Côte d'Ivoire and Senegal in 1978. Guinea has been active in efforts toward regional integration and cooperation, especially regarding the Organisation of African Unity and the Economic Organization of West African States (ECOWAS). Guinea takes its role in a variety of international organizations seriously and participates in their deliberations and decisions.

Africa

 Algiers (Embassy)

Luanda (Embassy)

 Kinshasa (Embassy)

Cairo (Embassy)

 Malabo (Embassy)

Addis Ababa (Embassy)

Libreville (Embassy)

Accra (Embassy)

Bissau (Embassy)

Monrovia (Embassy)

Tripoli (Embassy)

Abidjan (Embassy)

Bamako (Embassy)

Rabat (Embassy)

Abuja (Embassy)

Dakar (Embassy)

Freetown (Embassy)

 Pretoria (Embassy)

Americas

Brasília (Embassy)

Ottawa (Embassy)

Havana (Embassy)

 Washington, D.C. (Embassy)

Asia

Beijing (Embassy)

 New Delhi (Embassy)

Tehran (Embassy)

Tokyo (Embassy)

 Kuwait City (Embassy)

Kuala Lumpur (Embassy)

 Doha (Embassy)

Riyadh (Embassy)
Jeddah (Consulate-General)

 Ankara (Embassy)

Abu Dhabi (Embassy)

Europe

Brussels (Embassy)

Paris (Embassy)

Berlin (Embassy)

 Rome (Embassy)

Rome (Embassy)

Moscow (Embassy)

Belgrade (Embassy)

Madrid (Embassy)

Geneva (Embassy)

London (Embassy)

Embassy to open

Tel Aviv (Embassy)

Multilateral organisations

New York City (delegation to the United Nations)

Gallery

Non-resident ambassadors

 (Abuja)
 (Abuja)
 (Kuala Lumpur)
 (Moscow)
 (Addis Ababa)
 (Tokyo)
 (Tokyo)
 (Kuala Lumpur)
 (Addis Ababa)
 (Algiers)
 (Riyadh)

See also
Foreign relations of Guinea
List of diplomatic missions in Guinea

Notes

External links
Ministry of Foreign Affairs

Guinea
Diplomatic missions